Dylan Anthony Shiel (born 9 March 1993) is an Australian rules footballer playing for the Essendon Football Club in the Australian Football League (AFL). He was one of 12 underage recruits that GWS had access to as part of their list concessions.

Early life
Shiel attended Caulfield Grammar School, graduating in 2010, prior he attended St Bede's College in Mentone, Victoria. He was originally a  supporter.

He played seven games for the Dandenong Stingrays in the TAC Cup, averaging 30 disposals, kicking six goals and leading the league in contested possessions with 13 per match.

Shiel played 135 games at GWS, spanning 7 seasons playing mostly as one of the key midfielders in the side. He achieved All Australian selection in the 2017 season. At the conclusion of the 2018 AFL Season, Shiel was traded to Essendon.

2018: Trade to Essendon
Following a salary cap issue at the GWS Giants, Shiel was encouraged to explore his options elsewhere and with the intention to continue his football in Victoria in the coming years, he decided to entertain the idea. He met with four clubs: St Kilda, Hawthorn, Carlton and Essendon and decided with the latter,  Carlton explored extreme methods in trying to lure Dylan, flying the midfield star to Noosa on a private jet as part of a bold pitch to snare his signature. It is believed he turned down more than $3 million to sign with Essendon as he was chasing success over money and was put off by Carlton’s luxurious pitch which included caviar and an entourage of Carlton power brokers, including Chris Judd. The trade was done in the dying minutes of the 2018 Trade Period with two first-round picks being sent to GWS, and a second being sent back to Essendon, along with Shiel.

Shiel commenced his first pre-season at Essendon in November 2018 with the expectation of slotting straight into the starting midfield in his first game for the club against his old side on 24/3/2019.

2019: 1st year at Essendon
After a full preseason, Shiel played 4 games adjusting to playing in the Essendon midfield until playing his "breakout game" at his new club in Round 5 against North Melbourne.  Regarded by many as best afield,  Shiel recorded an astonishing 866 metres gained together with his 10 inside 50s and 4 goal assists. In the 2019 season Shiel came second in the Essendon Football Club Best and Fairest.

Statistics
 Statistics are correct to end of 2020

|- style="background-color: #EAEAEA"
! scope="row" style="text-align:center" | 2012
|style="text-align:center;"|
| 5 || 12 || 5 || 4 || 108 || 120 || 228 || 39 || 46 || 0.4 || 0.3 || 9.0 || 10.0 || 19.0 || 3.2 || 3.8
|- 
! scope="row" style="text-align:center" | 2013
|style="text-align:center;"|
| 5 || 21 || 11 || 11 || 194 || 217 || 411 || 62 || 70 || 0.5 || 0.5 || 9.2 || 10.3 || 19.6 || 3.0 || 3.3
|- style="background:#eaeaea;"
! scope="row" style="text-align:center" | 2014
|style="text-align:center;"|
| 5 || 17 || 9 || 11 || 186 || 207 || 393 || 65 || 82 || 0.5 || 0.7 || 10.9 || 12.2 || 23.1 || 3.8 || 4.8
|- 
! scope="row" style="text-align:center" | 2015
|style="text-align:center;"|
| 5 || 14 || 8 || 9 || 164 || 202 || 366 || 38 || 55 || 0.6 || 0.6 || 11.7 || 14.4 || 26.1 || 2.7 || 3.9
|- style="background:#eaeaea;"
! scope="row" style="text-align:center" | 2016
|style="text-align:center;"|
| 5 || 23 || 13 || 15 || 319 || 320 || 639 || 82 || 84 || 0.6 || 0.7 || 13.9 || 13.9 || 27.8 || 3.6 || 3.6
|- 
! scope="row" style="text-align:center" | 2017
|style="text-align:center;"|
| 5 || 25 || 12 || 15 || 329 ||327 || 656 || 65 || 92 || 0.5 || 0.6 || 13.2 || 13.1 || 26.2 || 2.6 || 3.7
|-
|- style="background:#eaeaea;"
! scope="row" style="text-align:center" | 2018
|style="text-align:center;"|
| 5 || 23 || 6 || 14 || 321 || 275 || 596 || 66 || 79 || 0.3 || 0.6 || 14.0 || 12.0 || 25.9 || 2.9 || 3.4
|-
! scope="row" style="text-align:center" | 2019
|style="text-align:center;"|
| 9 || 22 || 9 || 15 || 311 || 265 || 576 || 68 || 108 || 0.4 || 0.7 || 14.1 || 12.0 || 26.2 || 3.1 || 4.9
|-
|- style="background:#eaeaea;"
! scope="row" style="text-align:center" | 2020
|style="text-align:center;"|
| 9 || 15 || 4 || 6 || 188 || 159 || 347 || 38 || 52 || 0.3 || 0.4 || 12.5 || 10.6 || 23.1 || 2.5 || 3.5
|- class="sortbottom"
! colspan=3| Career
! 172
! 77
! 100
! 2120
! 2091
! 4211
! 523
! 668
! 0.5
! 0.6
! 12.3
! 12.2
! 24.5
! 3.0
! 3.9
|}

See also
List of Caulfield Grammar School people

References

External links

Living people
1993 births
Australian rules footballers from Victoria (Australia)
Dandenong Stingrays players
Greater Western Sydney Giants players
Essendon Football Club players
People educated at Caulfield Grammar School
All-Australians (AFL)